Węgrzynowo may refer to:
Węgrzynowo, Maków County in Masovian Voivodeship (east-central Poland)
Węgrzynowo, Płock County in Masovian Voivodeship (east-central Poland)
Węgrzynowo, Sierpc County in Masovian Voivodeship (east-central Poland)